Eímhín Craddock, former drummer with Galway band, The Saw Doctors, born 1986.

A native of Caherlistrane, Craddock began drumming around 1996. His interest in music developed while at secondary school in Headford, County Galway. A fan of The Saw Doctors since childhood, he joined the band in January 2007, having previously performed with Tuam musician, Noelie McDonnell.

The Saw Doctors' 2010 Album "The Further Adventures Of..." includes Eímhín's writing, evident on songs such as "Takin' The Train" and "Be Yourself."

Craddock has toured extensively with the group since he first joined, performing in the UK, Australia and the US.

Eímhín now plays with the Headford band "EDFT" and is a drum teacher at Cloughanover School of Rock.

External links
 https://web.archive.org/web/20100701061317/http://www.galwayindependent.com/profiles/profiles/eimhin-cradock-%11-drummer-with-the-saw-doctors/

Musicians from County Galway
Irish drummers
Male drummers
Living people
1986 births
21st-century drummers
21st-century male musicians
The Saw Doctors members